Li Lun (30 October 1927 – 25 June 2019) was a lieutenant general of the Chinese People's Liberation Army (PLA) who served as President of the PLA Logistics Academy and Deputy Director of the PLA General Logistics Department. He was the son of General Li Kenong.

Biography 
Li Lun was born as Li Runxiu (李润修) on 30 October 1927 in Wuhu, Anhui, Republic of China. He was the youngest son of Li Kenong, a Communist Party intelligence officer and general, and his wife Zhao Ying (赵瑛).

In 1939, Li Lun enlisted in the Eighth Route Army at the age of 12 and served as a messenger. In March 1941, his parents brought him to Yan'an, the Communist headquarters during the Second Sino-Japanese War, where he studied at the Yan'an Artillery School.

During the Chinese Civil War, Li began to engage in combat and fought in many battles including the Battle of Jinan, the Huaihai Campaign and the Yangtze River Crossing Campaign. He was promoted to Commander of the First Battalion of the Artillery Regiment of the East China Field Army. In 1949, he was awarded the First Class Merit for his performance in the Battle of the Zhoushan Archipelago.

After the founding of the People's Republic of China, Li worked in multiple positions in logistics. He was appointed President of the PLA Logistics Academy in 1986 and later promoted to Deputy Director of the PLA General Logistics Department. He attained the rank of lieutenant general in 1988.

Li died on 25 June 2019 in Beijing, at the age of 91.

References 

1927 births
2019 deaths
People from Wuhu
People's Liberation Army generals from Anhui
Eighth Route Army personnel
People of the Chinese Civil War